Jean Claude Barthélemy Dufay (July 18, 1896–November 6, 1967) was a French astronomer.

During his career he studied nebulae, interstellar matter, the night sky and cometary physics. In 1925, while working in collaboration with Jean Cabannes, he computed the altitude of the Earth's ozone layer. He was named the honorary director of the Lyon Observatory.
He became a member of the French Academy of Sciences in 1963.

His undergrad was completed in 1913 and his Ph.D. in 1928 under Charles Fabry and Jean Cabannes. In between, he served (and was wounded) in World War I and taught. Dufay was appointed at the Lyon Observatory since 1929 and stayed there until his retirement in 1966.

He was awarded the Valz Prize by the French Academy of Sciences in 1932 for his work on astronomical photometry. The crater Dufay on the Moon is named after him.

Bibliography
 Dufay, Jean. Nébuleuses galactiques et matière interstellaire (Albin Michel, 1957).
 Dufay, Jean. Introduction à l'astrophysique. Les étoiles (Armand Colin, 1961).

References

1896 births
1967 deaths
20th-century French astronomers
Members of the French Academy of Sciences